Perrinia docili is a species of sea snail, a marine gastropod mollusk in the family Chilodontidae.

Description
The size of the shell varies between 4.3 mm and 5.7 mm.

Distribution
This marine species occurs off the Philippines.

References

 Poppe G.T., Tagaro S.P. & Dekker H. (2006) The Seguenziidae, Chilodontidae, Trochidae, Calliostomatidae and Solariellidae of the Philippine Islands. Visaya Supplement 2: 1–228. page(s): 43

External links
 

 docili
Gastropods described in 2006